Carlos Johelín Santa Ramírez (born 7 January 1978 in Azua de Compostela) is a sprinter from the Dominican Republic who specializes in the 400 metres.

Career

He competed at the 2000 and 2004 Summer Olympics as well as the World Championships in 1999, 2003 and 2005, and finished fifth at the 2005 World Athletics Final.

In 2006 he finished fifth in 4 x 400 metres relay at the 2006 World Indoor Championships, together with teammates Arismendy Peguero, Danis García and Juan Betances, and won a bronze medal in the same event at the 2006 IAAF World Cup with the American team.

His personal best time is 45.05 seconds, achieved in August 2004 in Huelva.

Achievements

External links
 
Picture of Carlos Santa

References

1978 births
Living people
Dominican Republic male sprinters
Athletes (track and field) at the 2000 Summer Olympics
Athletes (track and field) at the 2004 Summer Olympics
Athletes (track and field) at the 1999 Pan American Games
Athletes (track and field) at the 2003 Pan American Games
Athletes (track and field) at the 2007 Pan American Games
Olympic athletes of the Dominican Republic
People from Azua Province
Pan American Games bronze medalists for the Dominican Republic
Pan American Games medalists in athletics (track and field)
Central American and Caribbean Games gold medalists for the Dominican Republic
Competitors at the 2002 Central American and Caribbean Games
Competitors at the 2006 Central American and Caribbean Games
World Athletics Indoor Championships medalists
Central American and Caribbean Games medalists in athletics
Medalists at the 2003 Pan American Games
Medalists at the 2007 Pan American Games
20th-century Dominican Republic people
21st-century Dominican Republic people